The Shengli Oil Field is the second-largest oil field in the People's Republic of China, with daily production of approximately .

It is located in the Yellow River delta, in the north of Shandong province bordering Bohai Sea. Its main working area covers 28 counties under the jurisdiction of eight prefecture level cities in Shandong Province, namely Dongying, Binzhou, Dezhou, Jinan, Weifang, Zibo, Liaocheng and Yantai. The major production area lies on both sides of the Yellow River Mouth.

The field was discovered in 1961 and its development began in 1964. It has accumulated proven oil of reserves of 4.63 billion tonnes.

References

Oil fields in China
Geography of Shandong